The 2017 Los Angeles mayoral election was held on March 7, 2017, to elect the mayor of Los Angeles. Due to a change in the city's election calendar to align mayoral elections with statewide elections, the winner stood to serve a term of five years and six months instead of the usual four years.

Municipal elections in California are officially non-partisan. Incumbent Eric Garcetti won a record 81.4% share of the vote in the primary, eliminating the need for a run-off. Voting turnout was relatively low at 20.1%.

Candidates

Declared
 Paul E. Amori
 Y.J. Draiman, businessman, member of the Northridge East Neighborhood Council, father of David Draiman and candidate for Mayor in 2013
 Eric Garcetti, incumbent Mayor of Los Angeles (Party preference: Democratic)
 David Hernandez, activist (Party preference: Republican)
 David "Zuma Dogg" Saltsburg, activist
 Rudy Melendez, laborer
 Frantz Pierre, activist
 Eric Preven, writer
 Mitchell Schwartz, political strategist, environmentalist and entrepreneur (Party preference: Democratic)
 Diane "Pinky" Harman, retired teacher
 Yuval Kremer, teacher
 Dennis Richter, factory worker

Withdrawn
 Steve Barr, educator, activist and founder of Green Dot Public Schools and Rock the Vote
 William Haynes, YouTube personality

Results

References

External links 
 Municipal elections in Los Angeles (2017) on BallotPedia
 CONSOLIDATED MUNICIPAL AND SPECIAL ELECTIONS FINAL LIST OF QUALIFIED CANDIDATES TO APPEAR ON THE BALLOT Election Date: 03/07/17 on Los Angeles County Registrar-Recorder/County Clerk

2017 in Los Angeles
2017 California elections
Eric Garcetti
Mayoral elections in Los Angeles
Los Angeles